Warrior Blade: Rastan Saga Episode III is an arcade beat 'em up game released by Taito in 1991. The sequel to Rastan Saga II, it is a weapons brawler similar to Golden Axe. Its main feature is the use of dual screens to depict the action. There are three characters to select: a warrior named Rastan, a hireling named Dewey, and a thief named Sophia. Although the game was only released in Japan, the text is in both Japanese and English. The game was later re-released as part of Taito Memories.

Gameplay
Similar to Golden Axe, Rastan Saga Episode III is a side-scrolling beat 'em up. The uses cutscenes to deliver its story and also features branching paths by offering the player a selection of different levels at certain points in the game. These were uncommon features for arcade games of the time.

Reception 
In Japan, Game Machine listed Warrior Blade: Rastan Saga Episode III on their July 1, 1992 issue as being the eleventh most-successful upright/cockpit arcade unit of the month.

References

External links
Gaming History
The Arcade Flyer Archive

1991 video games
Arcade video games
Arcade video games with multi-monitor setups
Taito beat 'em ups
Video games developed in Japan
Video games featuring female protagonists
Video games scored by Masahiko Takaki